Burgh by Sands Castle was located near the village of Burgh by Sands, Cumbria, England.

The castle was located to the east of the village. A fortified manor house is known in the 12th century. A circular pele tower was constructed in the 13th century. It was the caput of the barony of Burgh by Sands.

Originally held by Robert d'Estrivers, it passed by marriage of his daughter and heiress Ibria to Ranulf de Engaine. It later passed by the heiress Ada to Simon de Morville and then Thomas de Multon.

The castle was destroyed in 1339 during a raid by a Scottish army and was never rebuilt. No remains are evident above ground.

References
Curwen, J.F. Castles and Fortified Towers of Cumberland, Westmorland and Lancashire North of the Sands. Kendal Titus Wilson, 1913.
Sanders, I.J. English Baronies: A Study of their Origin and Descent 1086-1327, Oxford, 1960.

Castles in Cumbria
Burgh by Sands